Axel Bloch (5 May 1911 – 6 May 1998) was a Danish fencer. He competed in five events at the 1932 Summer Olympics.

References

1911 births
1998 deaths
Danish male fencers
Olympic fencers of Denmark
Fencers at the 1932 Summer Olympics
Sportspeople from Copenhagen